The 1898 VPI football team represented Virginia Agricultural and Mechanical College and Polytechnic Institute in the 1898 college football season. The team was led by their head coach J. Lewis Ingles and finished with a record of three wins and two losses (3–2).

Schedule

Players
The following players were members of the 1898 football team according to the roster published in the 1903 edition of The Bugle, the Virginia Tech yearbook.

References

VPI
Virginia Tech Hokies football seasons
VPI football